The Quinnipiac Barnacle was a parody newspaper at Quinnipiac University in Hamden, Connecticut.  The newspaper used to publish online daily while school was in session and monthly in print.

History 
While the official website of The Quinnipiac Barnacle states humorously that it was started in 1964 by Quinnipiac University President John Lahey,  it was actually started on November 5, 2012 by juniors Shane Collins and William Vessio as a parody news website.  The website received popularity and press on-campus, as well as strong negative feedback. In Fall 2013, The Barnacle became an officially recognized organization on the Quinnipiac campus  and came out with its first print edition on September 4, 2013.

The Barnacle worked on creating a web video series called BarnacleTV, but no launch date or information was made available to public.

Controversy 
An unofficial newspaper on the Quinnipiac campus, The Quad News, published a negative article about The Barnacle on November 11, 2012.  Shortly after, The Barnacle published a satirical response to the article titled "Quad News Staff Tries to Draw a Line."

See also
 List of satirical news websites

References

Quinnipiac University
American satirical websites